Camp JCA Shalom is a Jewish summer camp located in Malibu, California. The camp opened in 1951 in Barton Flats, California before moving to its current location in the Malibu mountains.

The camp offers many activities to campers including a climbing wall, swimming, environmental education, a zip-line, sea kayaking, Native American skills,
rappelling, canoeing, pioneer living, ropes course activities, water volleyball, gardening, mountain biking, beach trips, campcraft, Maccabiah Games, ceramics, archery, concerts, martial arts/Krav Maga, Gaga, Israeli days, digital photography, Ultimate Frisbee, campfires, Israeli dance, soccer, overnights, drama productions, and ping-pong.

In addition to regular camp activities, Camp Shalom provides programming for older campers. For kids entering the 10th or 11th grades, they have the opportunity to enroll in the TASC (Teen Age Service Camp) program. In TASC, participants build projects around the camp that helps to improve the campus. Past projects include benches, an amphitheater, and even a petting zoo. In addition, there is a special program for kids entering 11th grade only called Kibbutz, where the campers spend four weeks living in the garden and learning about simple, pioneer style living that is common on a kibbutz in Israel.

The counselor-in-training program is the place from which JCA gets most of its staff members. The counselors in training, all entering their senior years of high school, participate in a 5-week intensive program in which they do workshops in child development, Jewish programming, and leadership training to which they become sufficient to joining the other JCA staff members. The counselors in training have the opportunity, within those 5 weeks, to work with younger campers and learn about how to be an effective counselor and leader. This incredible program has been deemed a favorite by many who attend camp.  It's an enriching and exciting experience, one generally embarked by former campers of JCA. This is the perfect way of giving back to camp.

Camp JCA Shalom is also a popular filming location. Some movies and television shows that used the Camp Shalom campus for filming include The Simple Life, American Pie 2, Dog Eat Dog, and My Name is Earl.

The camp was destroyed on November 9, 2018 by the Woolsey Fire and they are now in the process of rebuilding the camp.

References

External links
 http://www.mysummercamps.com/camps/Detailed/Camp_JCA_Shalom_L20896.html
 https://www.campjcashalom.com/
 https://www.shalominstitute.com/

Buildings and structures in Los Angeles County, California
JCA Shalom